Khrenovoye is a rural locality (a selo) and the administrative center of Khrenovskoye Rural Settlement, Novousmansky District, Voronezh Oblast, Russia. The population was 999 as of 2010. There are 17 streets.

Geography 
Khrenovoye is located on the right bank of the Usmanka River, 16 km east of Novaya Usman (the district's administrative centre) by road. Rykan is the nearest rural locality.

References 

Rural localities in Novousmansky District